Michael McMaster (11 May 1896 – 29 March 1965) was an English first-class cricketer, Royal Naval Air Service officer and businessman.

The son of the Test cricketer Emile McMaster, he was born in May 1896 at Porlock, Somerset. He served in the First World War in the Royal Naval Air Service, being commissioned as a probationary sub-lieutenant, with his probation expiring in April 1917. He was promoted to flight lieutenant in August 1917. Following the war, McMaster made a single appearance in first-class cricket for the Royal Navy against Cambridge University at Fenner's in 1920. He scored 13 runs in the match, in addition to taking the wicket of Gilbert Ashton in the Cambridge first-innings. He was placed on the retired list at his own request in September 1920.

After leaving the Royal Navy, McMaster entered into the world of business, which took him to South Africa with Taylor and Ellis in Durban, before serving as the chairman of Slazenger. He died at Brook on the Isle of Wight in March 1965. His brother-in-law was the rugby union international Anthony Henniker-Gotley.

References

External links

1896 births
1965 deaths
People from West Somerset (district)
English people of Irish descent
Royal Navy officers
Royal Naval Air Service aviators
Royal Naval Air Service personnel of World War I
English cricketers
Royal Navy cricketers
Slazenger
20th-century English businesspeople
Military personnel from Somerset